Dionychoscelis is a monotypic genus of tiger moths in the family Erebidae. The genus includes one species, Dionychoscelis venata, which is found in Angola and the Democratic Republic of Congo.

References

External links
 Natural History Museum Lepidoptera generic names catalog

Spilosomina
Insects of Angola
Moths of Africa
Moths described in 1922
Monotypic moth genera